Events in the year 2003 in Burkina Faso.

Incumbents 

 President: Blaise Compaoré
 Prime Minister: Paramanga Ernest Yonli

Events 

 October – An alleged attempted coup occurs against President Blaise Compaoré and his Congress for Democracy and Progress regime.

Deaths

References 

 
2000s in Burkina Faso
Years of the 21st century in Burkina Faso
Burkina Faso
Burkina Faso